Kolomytsevo is a rural locality (a selo) and the administrative center of Kolomytsevskoye Rural Settlement, Prokhorovsky District, Belgorod Oblast, Russia. The population was 333 as of 2010. There are 6 streets.

Geography 
Kolomytsevo is located 34 km southeast of Prokhorovka (the district's administrative centre) by road. Novoselovka is the nearest rural locality.

References 

Rural localities in Prokhorovsky District